Cable car street railways first began operating in Los Angeles in 1885 and lasted until 1902, when the lines were electrified and electric streetcars were introduced largely following the cable car routes.

The first cable cars climbed Bunker Hill on October 8, 1885. A total of three companies operated in the period through 1902.

Los Angeles Cable Railway 
It operated the following lines as of August 1888:
Buena Vista St. line, Downtown to today's Chinatown: 1st & Main via Main, Bellevue  (now Sunset) via Buena Vista (now N. Broadway) to College St. 
Aliso St. line, Downtown to today's Boyle Heights: from Arcadia & Main via Aliso, Pleasant, and First to Evergreen & First
Blue line: Downtown to today's Pico-Union district: from Temple & Main via Main to First to Spring to Ninth to Pearl (now Figueroa) to Pico to Washington Bl. to Vermont Avenue car barn
Olive St. line: from today's Lincoln Heights via Downtown to today's Pico-Union district: from Pritchard (now Lincoln Park Av.) and Pearl (now N. Broadway) via Pearl to Olympia, San Fernando (now N. Spring), Alameda, Main, First, Spring, Fifth, Olive, Twelfth, Figueroa, Washington to Vermont car barn
W. 9th St. line: from today's Westlake via Downtown to today's Glassell Park: from Ninth and Grand View , via Ninth, Figueroa, Sixth, Hill, Fourth, Broadway, First, Spring, Marchessault, Main, San Fernando, Olympia, Downey (N. Broadway), Chestnut (now Avenue 20), Pasadena, Daily, to Avenue 33.
Kuhrts St. line: Downtown to today's Lincoln Park: from the Plaza via Main to the Los Angeles River, Kuhrts (now E. Main St.), Mission Street Road to opposite the Selig Zoo.

Temple Street Cable Railway 
The Temple Street Cable Railway began service on July 14, 1886. It was bought by and merged into the Pacific Electric Railway, which replaced the cable cars with electric streetcar service on October 2, 1902. The route was transferred to the Los Angeles Railway in 1910. Service on the last remaining portion of the route was discontinued in 1946.

Second Street Cable Railroad 
The Second Street Cable Railroad began service October 8, 1885 and ended service October 13, 1889. It operated one route via Second Street west, up Bunker Hill, to Second and Texas (now Belmont) Street. The powerhouse was at Second at Boylston, now a Los Angeles Department of Water and Power installation. Near the terminus at First and Belmont Avenue, a railroad line ran to Gardner Junction at what is now Gardner and Sunset in Hollywood; from Belmont to Temple, Coronado, south on a private right-of-way to First; on First and private right-of-way to Western and Temple, via Western to Hollywood Boulevard west and via private right-of-way to Gardner Junction. The Pacific Electric acquired this line and ran interurbans on it.

Funiculars
Los Angeles also hosted several funicular railways. Angels Flight operated in Downtown Los Angeles from 1901 to 1969 when its site was cleared for redevelopment. The railway was rebuilt south of its original location in 1996. It was designated a Los Angeles Historic-Cultural Monument in 1962 and was added to the National Register of Historic Places in 2000.

Court Flight ran up Bunker Hill between Broadway and Hill along "Court Street", between Temple and 1st. It operated from 1905 to 1943 when it was destroyed in a fire.

The Mount Lowe Railway was a tourist railway which featured a funicular section.

References

External links
Map of Los Angeles Cable Railway
Map of Temple Street Cable Railway and Second Street Cable Railroad

Cable car railways in the United States
Streetcars in California
1885 establishments in California
Transportation in Los Angeles